Saltonstall may refer to:

People
Richard Saltonstall (mayor) (1517–1600), skinner and Lord Mayor of London
Richard Saltonstall (1586–1661), colonist and nephew of the above Richard
Wye Saltonstall (born 1602), English poet and translator, grandson of Lord Mayor Richard
Nathaniel Saltonstall (1639–1707), Massachusetts judge during the Salem Witch Trials of 1692
Gurdon Saltonstall (1666–1724), governor of Connecticut Colony
Nathaniel Saltonstall (American Revolution) (1727–1807), captain of Connecticut naval privateer ships during the American Revolutionary War
Dudley Saltonstall (1738–1796), captain in the Continental Navy during the American Revolutionary War
Gurdon Saltonstall Mumford (1764–1831), New York congressman
Leverett Saltonstall I (1783–1845), Massachusetts politician
Gurdon Saltonstall Hubbard (1802–1886), Chicago businessman
Richard Saltonstall Greenough (1819–1904), sculptor
Leverett Saltonstall (1892–1979), Republican Governor of Massachusetts and U.S. Senator
Elizabeth Saltonstall (1900–1990), American painter and lithographer

Other uses
Lake Saltonstall (disambiguation)
Mount Saltonstall, in the Queen Maud Mountains, Antarctica
Saltonstall Mountain or Saltonstall Ridge, New Haven, Connecticut, U.S.

See also
Saltonstall family